Adolph Coors III (January 12, 1915 – February 9, 1960) was the grandson of Adolph Coors and heir to the Coors Brewing Company empire.

Life and career

Coors was born on January 12, 1915, the son of Alice May (née Kistler; 1885–1970) and Adolph Coors Jr. He attended Phillips Exeter Academy in New Hampshire. Like his father and his youngest brother Joseph Coors, Adolph graduated from Cornell University, where he was president of the Quill and Dagger society and a member of the Kappa Alpha Society. Coors was also a semiprofessional baseball player. At the time of his death, he was CEO and chairman of the board of the Coors Brewing Company in Golden, Colorado. Coors married Mary Urquhart Grant in November 1940. The couple had four children together.

Kidnapping 

On February 9, 1960, while on his way to work, Coors was murdered in a failed kidnapping attempt by escaped murderer Joseph Corbett Jr. on Turkey Creek Bridge near Morrison, Colorado.

On the morning of February 9, a milkman discovered Coors' International Travelall on the bridge, empty of occupants and with the radio on. Police identified the vehicle as belonging to Coors, and began a search of the area that turned up Coors' hat, glasses, and a blood stain. The following day, his wife Mary received a ransom note in the mail requesting $500,000 for his safe release. The hunt for Coors and his assailant was the largest FBI effort since the Lindbergh baby kidnapping.

On September 11, 1960, a hiker by the name of Edward Lee Greene Jr. stumbled upon a pair of discarded trousers in the Rocky Mountains, and found in the pocket a penknife bearing the initials 'ACIII'. Then on September 15, 1960, a shirt belonging to Coors, and his skull, were found in a remote area near Pikes Peak.

A witness turned up that revealed he had seen a yellow 1951 Mercury with the letters "AT" and numerals "62" somewhere in the license plate combination on the bridge around the time of Coors' disappearance. A car matching the description was found torched in a dump in Atlantic City, New Jersey. Investigators traced the car back to a Colorado resident named Walter Osborne, who suspiciously moved out of his Denver apartment the day after the kidnapping. The name "Walter Osborne" was revealed to be an alias for Corbett. Due to international obsession with the case, including a picture of Corbett in an issue of Reader's Digest, he was recognized by two neighbors in Vancouver, BC, and was arrested.

As no witnesses were found, prosecutors built their case against Corbett through circumstantial and forensic evidence. Corbett's coworkers overheard him talking about a plan that would earn him over a million dollars and the ransom note typeface was traced back to Corbett's typewriter. The biggest piece of evidence, however, was the soil found in the undercarriage of the yellow Mercury. Investigators were able to trace the car's path by noting the rare pink feldspar and granite minerals found in the area Coors' body was discovered. Corbett was convicted of first-degree murder on March 29, 1961, and sentenced to life in state prison. He was released on parole in 1980 for good behavior and drove a truck for the Salvation Army until he retired. He died by suicide at the age of 80 in August 2009. He lived and died just 10 miles from where he killed Coors and always maintained his innocence.

The kidnapping was featured in the Forensic Files episode "Bitter Brew". The 2017 true crime book The Death of an Heir: Adolph Coors III and the Murder That Rocked an American Brewing Dynasty by Phillip Jett details the kidnapping.

Legacy
An avid skier, Coors was inducted into the Colorado Ski and Snowboard Hall of Fame in 1998.

See also
List of kidnappings
List of solved missing persons cases

References

1915 births
1960 deaths
1960s missing person cases
20th-century American businesspeople
American murder victims
Coors family
Cornell University alumni
Kidnapped businesspeople
Missing person cases in Colorado
People murdered in Colorado
Phillips Exeter Academy alumni
1960 murders in the United States